BJ Energy Solutions was founded in 1872 as the Byron Jackson Company in Woodland, California by inventor Byron Jackson  and at its peak operated in more than 50 countries worldwide.

The link below from fundinguniverse.com tells how BJ was acquired by Hughes Tool and then became independent when Baker Tool bought Hughes and was recently acquired by Baker-Hughes.

BJ Services Company is a leading worldwide provider of pressure pumping and oilfield services for the petroleum industry. Pressure pumping services consist of cementing and stimulation services used in the completion of new oil and natural gas wells and in remedial work on existing wells, both onshore and offshore. Oilfield services include completion tools, completion fluids, casing and tubular services, production chemical services, and precommissioning, maintenance and turnaround services in the pipeline and process business, including pipeline inspection.

On April 28, 2010, the company was bought by Baker Hughes in a $5.5 billion stock and cash deal. Greenhill & Co. advised on the transaction.

In December 2016, it was announced that Baker Hughes would be dividing off its North America Land Pressure Pumping division to form a new independent BJ Services Company. BJ Services is positioned with a strategic footprint to serve clients in all targeted North American basins. The new company will include ALLIED Services and ALTCEM. In addition to Baker Hughes, owners include Goldman Sachs and the private equity firm CSL Capital Management.

On 20 July 2020, BJ Service filed Chapter 11 bankruptcy.

In September 2020, a group of private investors purchased the BJ brand along with a portion of the fracturing assets to create BJ Energy Solutions, LLC. The company operates in North American basins and utilizes Next-Generation Fracturing technology.

See also 

 List of oilfield service companies

References

External links 
Byron Jackson Company – Early History
A historian at the Huntington on the historic impact of the centrifugal pump and the role of the Byron Jackson Company.

Companies based in Houston
Oil companies of the United States
Oilfield services companies
Companies that filed for Chapter 11 bankruptcy in 2020
2010 mergers and acquisitions